Visnea L.f. is a monotypic genus of plant in family Pentaphylacaceae. The genus only contains the following species (but this information may be incomplete); Visnea mocanera  which is native to the Canary Islands and Madeira.

The genus name of Visnea is in honour of Gérard de Visme (c. 1725 – c. 1797), a French and English merchant in Lisbon, Portugal. 
The Latin specific epithet of mocanera refers to another genus of plants from India and Malesia, (which is now a synonym of Dipterocarpus 
The genus was first described and published in Suppl. Pl. on page 36 in 1782.

The fruits of the tree (known as Mocan) are edible.

Note; Visnea Steud. ex Endl. is a synonym of Barbacenia, a genus in a different family.

Fossil record
Four fossil seeds of a Visnea sp. have been described from middle Miocene strata of the Fasterholt area near Silkeborg in Central Jutland, Denmark.

References

Pentaphylacaceae
Ericales genera
Taxonomy articles created by Polbot
Plants described in 1845
Flora of the Canary Islands
Flora of Madeira